Pasco is an unincorporated community in Shelby County, in the U.S. state of Ohio.

History
A post office called Pasco was established in 1893, and remained in operation until 1905. Besides the post office, Pasco had a country store.

References

Unincorporated communities in Shelby County, Ohio
Unincorporated communities in Ohio